Shyriaieve is an urban-type settlement in the west of Odesa Oblast, Ukraine. Population: 

Shyriaieve is located on the banks of the Velykyi Kuialnyk.

History
Shyriaieve was founded in the end of the 18th century as Stepanivka, named after the landowner Stepan Shyriay.  The area was settled after 1792, when the lands between the Southern Bug and the Dniester were transferred to Russia according to the Iasi Peace Treaty. The area was included in Tiraspolsky Uyezd, which belonged to Yekaterinoslav Viceroyalty until 1795, Voznesensk Viceroyalty until 1796, Novorossiya Governorate until 1803, and Kherson Governorate until 1920. In 1834, the area was transferred to newly established Ananyevsky Uyezd. In the middle of the 19th century it was formally renamed Shiriaieve (Shyriaievo).

On 16 April 1920, Odesa Governorate split off, and Ananiv Uyezd was moved to Odessa Governorate, where it was abolished in 1921. In 1923, uezds in Ukrainian Soviet Socialist Republic were abolished, and the governorates were divided into okruhas.

Economy

Transportation
Shyriaieve has access to the M05 highway (Ukraine) which connects Kyiv and Odessa. Other roads connect it with Podilsk, Ananiv, and Berezivka.

References

Urban-type settlements in Berezivka Raion
Ananyevsky Uyezd